First Lady or First Gentleman of Costa Rica (Spanish: Primera dama o Primer caballero de Costa Rica) is the title of the wife or husband of the president of Costa Rica. Traditionally, the president's wife was colloquially known as la presidenta ("the president", with a feminine -a ending). The current term was first used under Federico Alberto Tinoco Granados.

Operations
The Office of First Lady of First Gentleman is allocated no official funding from the government budget of Costa Rica. Instead, the office and officeholder relies on private donations to cover the expenses. These funds support the first lady's causes and foundations, which traditionally focus on cultural, environmental, and social issues. The office of Leila Rodríguez Stahl, the first lady 2002 to 2006, had a staff of approximately 60 at its largest. However, many of those staffers worked pro bono or were employed temporarily from other government offices.

First ladies and gentlemen of Costa Rica (1847–present)

References

 
Costa Rica